Sultan Musabah  is an Emirati footballer.

External links
 Sultan Profile At Al Ain Fc.net Official Site
  Sultan Statistics At Goalzz.com

Emirati footballers
Al Ain FC players
Baniyas Club players
Living people
UAE Pro League players
1988 births
Association football goalkeepers